Richard Beechner is a former American football coach.  He served as the head football coach at Hiram Scott College in Scottsbluff, Nebraska. He was the only head football coach in the school's history because Hiram Scott only existed from 1965 to 1970, and was shut down due to massive debt. Hiram Scott did not have a single losing season in its five years as a football program. Its two biggest wins came on September 24, 1966 over the Omaha (13–7) and on November 7, 1970 over Boise State (7–3).

Beechner was also an assistant football coach at Nebraska, Missouri and Washington State.  He also served as an associate athletic director at Washington State.

Head coaching record

References

External links
 
 

Year of birth missing (living people)
1930s births
Living people
Hiram Scott Scotties football coaches
Missouri Tigers football coaches
Nebraska Cornhuskers football coaches
Nebraska–Kearney Lopers athletic directors
Washington State Cougars football coaches
College golf coaches in the United States
High school football coaches in Nebraska
Sportspeople from Lincoln, Nebraska